The Battle of Lochaber was a battle fought in 1429, in the Scottish Highlands, between the forces of Alexander of Islay, Earl of Ross, 3rd Lord of the Isles and chief of Clan Donald against the Royalist army of King James I of Scotland.

It is known as the Battle of Split Allegiances among the Camerons. This is explained either by the fact that they deserted when faced with the prospect of supporting their feudal lord against their king, or that different factions in the clan lined up on both sides.

Background
Lochaber was part of Princess Margaret's dowry when she married John Macdonald (John of Islay), Lord of the Isles, in the mid 14th century. In turn their eldest son, Donald Macdonald, Lord of the Isles, gave the lordship of Lochaber to his younger brother, Alexander. Robert Stewart, Duke of Albany, enemy of the Macdonalds, took effective control of the north of Scotland towards the end of the reign of his father Robert II, in the absence of the young King James I, who was a prisoner of England's kings (first Richard II and then King Henry IV).

Albany's power increased during the reign (1390–1406) of his ineffective elder brother Robert III. He then became regent whilst James I was held captive in England. After Albany's death in 1420, the Scots paid a ransom to release James. James returned in 1424 determined to bring his kingdom to heel; one of his first acts was to execute most of Albany's heirs and restore the Earldom of Ross to the Macdonalds. Albany's grandson James Mór rebelled, attacking Dumbarton and killing the King's uncle John Stewart of Dundonald, but was driven into exile in Ireland and died in 1429.

Throughout the 15th century the Lords of the Isles attempted to secure their lands on the mainland of Scotland at the expense of the Scottish kings in Edinburgh. In particular, second Lord, Donald claimed the Earldom of Ross through his marriage to Mariota (Margaret), Countess of Ross. He had claimed this territory while Albany was ruling as Regent and then successfully pursued his claim by right of the sword in 1411 at the Battle of Harlaw near Inverurie. Margaret's niece Euphemia inherited the title in 1402 but was persuaded in 1415 to resign it in favor of Albany's son John Stewart, Earl of Buchan but that did not last.

Margaret ignored the transfer and claimed that she had inherited the title on Euphemia's death in 1424, whilst Buchan's death the same year gave his first cousin King James a "highly dubious claim" to the title. However, in 1424 James confirmed Margaret as Countess of Ross. In 1429 Margaret died and her son Alexander, Lord of the Isles claimed the title by inheritance from his mother.

James called a Parliament at Inverness Castle in late August 1428, at which Alexander, Margaret and 'nearly all the notable men of the north' were arrested. One theory is that James wanted to replace Alexander with his uncle John Mór as Lord of the Isles, but he was forced to release Alexander either as a result of John's death in 1429 or as a precondition set by John before he would negotiate. Some sources say Alexander was imprisoned for a few weeks, others say for a year; three other chiefs were executed. In the end the earldom remained with Alexander Macdonald and Clan Donald.

Campaign
This leads to the suggestion that John's son Donald Balloch stirred up rebellion in 1429 to avenge his father's death. However Alexander will have wanted to make a show of force in Ross following his wife's death, and his imprisonment in Inverness gave him a particular reason to take revenge on that town. His great-nephew's Raid on Ross in 1491 provides a possible template – capture the garrison at Inverness, then head north to ravage the lands of royalist sympathisers in Ross.

Tradition has it that Alexander led an army of "upwards of 10,000 men". While this may well be an exaggeration by the chroniclers, the events at the Inverness Parliament appear to have forged an unusual coalition between clans such as the Camerons and the Chattan Confederation (Clan Mackintosh), who had been feuding for over a century. However, the islanders failed to secure help from England, which would have made the revolt much more serious for James. 

It seems that Alexander marched up the Great Glen to Inverness, where he burnt the city and besieged the castle, but failed to capture it. Without the logistics to support such a great army for long in the field, he seems to have started heading back for home in the west. The King gathered an army and set off in pursuit.

Battle
The Royalists appear to have caught the clansmen by surprise on a moor or "marshy ground" somewhere in Lochaber, the district around Fort William at the western end of the Great Glen. The exact location is not known, and there is also some uncertainty about the date of the battle. Traditionally it was on 23 June 1429, the "vigil" (i.e. day before) of the feast day of the Nativity of St. John the Baptist but some modern sources say 26 June.

Faced by the Royalist forces, the Camerons under Donald Dubh defected from their feudal overlord to the Crown. Another theory is that the MacMartin Camerons went over to the King but not the Camerons of Lochiel, hence the Camerons know this battle as the "Battle of Split Allegiances". The Mackintoshes also switched sides. History does not record whether these changes of mind required inducements from James. However, soon afterwards the King gave the Mackintoshes lands in Lochaber belonging to Alexander's uncle, Alexander of Lochalsh.

After this loss of manpower, Alexander was either defeated in battle or fled without a fight.

Aftermath

Alexander escaped to the islands and his first attempt to sue for peace was refused. So he went secretly to Edinburgh and dressed only in his shirt and drawers, he handed over his sword to James in the royal church of Holyrood Abbey on 28 August (or in early 1430). The Queen was impressed by his humility and pleaded for his life so Alexander was imprisoned again, this time in Tantallon Castle.

He was released in November 1431, after the collapse of Donald Balloch's rebellion in that year. After the death of the Earl of Mar in 1435, James accepted Alexander's position as Earl of Ross and allowed him control of Inverness.

One theory holds that the battle of Lochaber was a defining moment in the early history of the Clan Cameron, at that time it was more a confederation than a homogenous clan and the MacMartins' defection reflected this. In this view of history, the MacMartins were punished for their treachery by the Camerons of Lochiel, such that the MacMartin chiefs were driven into exile and the Lochiel faction took control of the clan. Donald Dubh appears to have supported James in his defeat at the Battle of Inverlochy in 1431 and the Cameron lands were ravaged afterwards. When Alexander was released, he took further vengeance on the clan he viewed as traitors, driving Donald Dubh into exile and giving the Cameron lands in Lochiel to John Garve Maclean of Coll.

Notes and references

1429 in Scotland
15th-century Scottish clan battles
History of the Scottish Highlands
Conflicts in 1429